Kajal Gupta (born as Sandhya Chattopadhyay , 8 January 1936 – 22 October 1996) was an Indian Bengali film actress known for Basanta Bilap (1973), Sansarer Itikatha (1983) and Agnishwar (1975).

Biography
Kajal Gupta was born on 8 January 1936 in Calcutta, Bengal Presidency, British India (now India) as Sandhya Chattopadhyay. She was married to director Dinen Gupta, who directed her in Basanta Bilap. She died in Kolkata, West Bengal, India in 22 October 1996.

Filmography
 Nati Binodini (1994) 
 Antaranga (1988) 
 Hirer Shikal (1988)
 Abir (1987) 
 Mahamilan (1987) 
 Abhimaan (1986)
 Amar Kantak (film) (1986)  
 Rashifal (1984) 
 Agami Kal (1983) 
 Indira (1983) 
 Arpita (1983) 
 Sansarer Itikatha (1983) 
 Priyatama (1980) 
 Bandhan (1980) 
 Tilottama (1978) 
 Charmurti (1978) 
 Sanai (1977) 
 Dampati (1976) 
 Harmonium (1976) 
 Raag Anurag (1975) 
 Agnishwar (1975) 
 Sangini (1974) 
 Marjina Abdulla (1973) 
 Basanta Bilap (1973) 
 Ajker Nayak (1972)
 Jaban (1972)
 Banajyotsana (1969) 
 The New Leaf (1969) 
 Mukhujey Paribar (1965)
 Jatugriha (1964)
 Kancher Swarga (1962)
 Ajantrik (1958)

References

External links

1936 births
1996 deaths
20th-century Indian actresses
Bengali actresses
Actresses from Kolkata
Indian film actresses
Actresses in Bengali cinema